Hendrik Witbooi may refer to:

 Hendrik Witbooi (Namaqua chief) (1825–1905)
 Hendrik Samuel Witbooi (1906–1978)
 Hendrik Witbooi (politician) (1934–2009), deputy prime minister of Namibia